Nothing but a Burning Light is an album by Canadian singer/songwriter Bruce Cockburn. It was released in 1991 by Columbia Records.

Reception

In a retrospective review, AllMusic critic Brett Hartenbach wrote of the album: "Throughout, Burnett's production is understated, allowing Cockburn's voice, guitar, and songs to lead the way over a solid foundation of bass, drums, and tasteful organ by Booker T. Jones. This sort of sympathetic production brings out the best in Cockburn and his material, which is consistently strong... Though it may lack the immediate power, Nothing but a Burning Light is Bruce Cockburn's best since his 1984 release Stealing Fire." The New York Times called the album the finest of Cockburn's career, writing that he "has returned to a simpler, more reflective folk-rock mode." Trouser Press wrote that the album "contains some of Cockburn’s best loved songs ('A Dream Like Mine', 'Great Big Love') but falls a notch or two below great."

Track listing
All songs written by Bruce Cockburn, except where noted.
"A Dream Like Mine" – 3:53
"Kit Carson" – 4:12
"Mighty Trucks of Midnight" – 5:57
"Soul of a Man" (Blind Willie Johnson, arr. Bruce Cockburn) – 3:52
"Great Big Love" – 5:13
"One of the Best Ones" – 6:57
"Somebody Touched Me" – 4:16
"Cry of a Tiny Babe" – 7:31
"Actions Speak Louder" – 3:01
"Indian Wars" – 6:58
"When It's Gone, It's Gone" – 4:19
"Child of the Wind" – 4:08

Personnel
Bruce Cockburn – electric guitar (tracks 1, 2, 3, 5, 7, 8, 9, 11), acoustic guitar (5, 6, 10), resonator guitar (tracks 4, 12) and vocals
Booker T. Jones – organ (tracks 1, 2, 3, 6, 7, 8, 9, 11, 12)
Jim Keltner – drums (tracks 2, 3, 4, 6, 7, 8), percussion (track 2), washboard (track 4)
Edgar Meyer – acoustic bass (tracks 2, 6, 7, 8, 9, 12), bass (track 11)
Larry Klein – bass (tracks 1, 3, 5, 7, 9)
Michael Been – bass (tracks 2, 4, 6, 8)
Denny Fongheiser – drums (tracks 1, 5, 7, 9)
Michael Blair – percussion (tracks 1, 5, 11), tambourine (track 7)
Ralph Forbes – percussion (tracks 1, 5, 9, 11)
Mark O'Connor – violin (tracks 6, 10, 11, 12)
Sam Phillips – backing vocals (tracks 1, 5, 8)
T-Bone Burnett – electric guitar (track 5), acoustic guitar (track 7)
Jackson Browne – backing vocals (tracks 5, 10), resonator guitar (track 10)

Production
T-Bone Burnett – producer
Joe Henry – production assistant
Pat McCarthy – engineer, mixer
Dave Leonard – mixer (track 1)
Paula "Max" Garcia – second engineer
Chris Austopchuk – art direction
Anton Corbijn – photography

References

1991 albums
Bruce Cockburn albums
Albums produced by T Bone Burnett
True North Records albums